Corndogorama is a yearly music festival held in Atlanta, Georgia.  Founded by Dave Railey in 1996, it features performances from local bands including Indie rock, Hip hop, Metal, and Electronic groups.

References 

 "Dazed and confused", Chad Radford
 "Evolution of a Corndog", Chad Radford (retrieved June 24, 2008)

Music festivals in Atlanta